Sanana or Sulabesi Island (earlier name Xulla Besi) is an island south of Mangoli Island, and is part of the Sula Islands Regency in the North Maluku province of Indonesia. Sanana is also the name of that island's largest settlement, home to the Dutch era fort Benteng De Verwachting.

Administrative Districts 

The island is divided into six districts within the Sula Islands Regency, which are set out below with their areas and the populations at the 2010 Census and the 2020 Census. The table also includes the locations of the district administrative centres, and the number of villages (rural desa and urban kelurahan) in each district.

Transportation
Sanana airport is linked to Ambon by Trigana Air Service flights.

History
As was common throughout Maluku at that time, Sanana suffered serious religio-ethnic tensions between Muslims and Christians during 1999.

Flora and fauna
Frog Callulops kopsteini, also known as Kopstein's callulops frog, is endemic to Sanana Island.

Gallery

References 

Landforms of North Maluku
Islands of the Maluku Islands